In taxonomy, the Thermoplasmataceae are a family of the Thermoplasmatales. It contains only one genus, Thermoplasma.  All species within Thermoplasmataceae are thermoacidophiles, and they grow at a temperature of  60°C and pH 2.  They were isolated from hydrothermal vents, fumaroles and similar environments.

Phylogeny
The currently accepted taxonomy is based on the List of Prokaryotic names with Standing in Nomenclature (LPSN) and National Center for Biotechnology Information (NCBI).

See also
 List of Archaea genera

References

Further reading

Scientific journals

Scientific books

Scientific databases

External links

Archaea taxonomic families
Euryarchaeota